Lycée d'Arabe is a school in Nouakchott, Mauritania. It is located opposite (south) to the Stade de la Capitale, (east) to the College des Garçons and (north) to the Institut Superieur des Etudes et Recherches Islamique.

See also

 Education in Mauritania
 Lists of schools

References

Educational institutions with year of establishment missing
Nouakchott
Schools in Mauritania